Allen Mulherin Steele, Jr. (born January 19, 1958) is an American journalist and science fiction author.

Background 
Steele was born in Nashville, Tennessee on January 19, 1958. He was introduced to science fiction fandom attending meetings of Nashville's science fiction club. He graduated high school from the Webb School in Bell Buckle, Tennessee, received a bachelor's degree from New England College and a master's from the University of Missouri.

Writing 
Before he established himself as a science fiction author, he spent several years working as a journalist. Steele began publishing short stories in 1988. His early novels formed a future history beginning with Orbital Decay and continuing through Labyrinth of Night. Some of his early novels such as Orbital Decay and Lunar Descent were about blue-collar workers working on future construction projects in space. Since 1992, he has tended to focus on stand-alone projects and short stories, although he has written five novels about the moon Coyote.

Steele serves on the Board of Advisors for both the Space Frontier Foundation and the Science Fiction and Fantasy Writers of America, and he is a former member (Eastern Regional Director) of the SFWA Board of Directors. In April 2001, he testified before the Subcommittee on Space and Aeronautics of the U.S. House of Representatives, in hearings regarding space exploration in the 21st century.

In 2004, he contributed a chapter to the collaborative hoax novel, Atlanta Nights.

Awards 
Allen Steele received several awards for his writing:
 1990: Locus Award for Orbital Decay
 1996: Hugo Award for "The Death of Captain Future"
 1997: Locus Award for ""... Where Angels Fear to Tread""
 1997: Science Fiction Chronicle Readers Award for ""... Where Angels Fear to Tread""
 1998: Hugo Award for ""... Where Angels Fear to Tread""
 1998: Seiun Award for "The Death of Captain Future"
 2002: Asimov's Readers' Award for "Stealing Alabama"
 2005: Asimov's Readers' Award for "The Garcia Narrows Bridge"
 2011: Hugo Award for "The Emperor of Mars"
 2013: Seiun Award for "The Emperor of Mars"
 2013: Robert A. Heinlein Award (together with Yoji Kondo)
 2014: Asimov's Readers' Award for "The Legion of Tomorrow"

Bibliography

Novels
 
 The Tranquillity Alternative (1996)
 Oceanspace (2000)
 Chronospace (2001) Re-released for Kindle under the Author's preferred title, Time Loves a Hero
 Apollo's Outcasts (2012)
 V-S Day (2014)
 Arkwright (2016)

Near-Space series
also called Rude Astronauts series
 Orbital Decay (1989)
 Clarke County, Space (1990)
 Lunar Descent (1991)
 Labyrinth of Night (1992)
 A King of Infinite Space (1997)

Coyote series
 Coyote Trilogy
 Coyote: A Novel of Interstellar Exploration (2002)
 Coyote Rising: A Novel of Interstellar Revolution (2004)
 Coyote Frontier: A Novel of Interstellar Colonization (2005)
 Coyote Chronicles
 Coyote Horizon (2009)
 Coyote Destiny (2010)
 Coyote Universe
 Spindrift (2007)
 Galaxy Blues (2008)
 Hex (2011)

Captain Future series
 Avengers of the Moon (2017)
 The Return of Ul Quorn, Book I: Captain Future in Love (2019)
 The Return of Ul Quorn, Book II: The Guns of Pluto (2020)
 ‘’The Return of Ul Quorn, Book III: 1,500 Light Years From Home (2021)
 ‘’The Return of Ul Quorn, Book IV: The Horror at Jupiter (2021)

Chapbooks
 The Weight (1995)
 The Days Between (2002)
 The River Horses (2007)
 Angel of Europa (2011)

Short fiction
Collections
 Rude Astronauts (1992)
 All-American Alien Boy (1996)
 Sex and Violence in Zero-G: The Complete Near-Space Stories (1998)
 American Beauty (2003)
 The Last Science Fiction Writer (2008)
 
Stories

Non-fiction
 Primary Ignition (2003) includes articles and essays from 1997–2004

Critical studies and reviews of Steele's work
Tales of Time and Space
 
———————
Notes

References

External links
 
 
 Encyclopedia of Science Fiction entry
 Official Coyote Series Website
 Review of The Last Science Fiction Writer on SF Site by Steven H Silver

1958 births
Living people
20th-century American male writers
20th-century American novelists
20th-century American short story writers
21st-century American male writers
21st-century American non-fiction writers
21st-century American novelists
21st-century American short story writers
American male journalists
American male novelists
American male short story writers
American science fiction writers
Asimov's Science Fiction people
Hugo Award-winning writers
New England College alumni
Novelists from Tennessee
People from Nashville, Tennessee
University of Missouri alumni